Orizzontale is a public art work by artist Aldo Calo located at the Lynden Sculpture Garden near Milwaukee, Wisconsin. The abstract sculpture consists of stacked geometricized slabs of bronze; it is installed on a base on the lawn.

References

Outdoor sculptures in Milwaukee
1964 sculptures
Bronze sculptures in Wisconsin
1960s establishments in Wisconsin
Abstract sculptures in Wisconsin